The Palladium at the Center for the Performing Arts is 1,600-seat,  concert hall located in Carmel, Indiana. 

After years of planning, The Palladium, one of three venues that comprises the Center for the Performing Arts,  opened on January 29, 2011 and today serves as a venue for various musical concerts and performances. It is located at 1 Center Green, adjacent to the Carmel City Center. The four-fronted, symmetrical design of The Palladium, massed around the domed central space of the single room concert hall was inspired by Andrea Palladio’s Villa Capra, La Rotonda (1566). The Palladium is based upon the traditional shoebox-shaped concert hall with high ceilings and massive, sound-reflecting walls. The facility also features a limestone façade and movable acoustical panels that can significantly alter the acoustics of the hall.

The Palladium was designed by David M. Schwarz Architects of Washington, D.C. with local consultation by CSO Architects as Architect of Record. Indianapolis-based Shiel Sexton Co. Inc. served as construction manager.

The Palladium is home to the Great American Songbook Foundation. The organization's administrative headquarters are located on the Gallery level.

The other two venues that comprise the Center are the 500 seat Tarkington Theatre and the Studio Theatre – a black box with flexible seating. 

Steven Libman was the founding President and CEO of The Center for the Performing Arts from 2009 to 2011. While there, he successfully planned and launched the first few seasons and produced two major opening night festival galas with: Michael Feinstein, Chris Botti, Neil Sedaka, Dionne Warwick, David Hyde Pierce and dancers from American Ballet Theatre. He also produced a PBS special with Michael Feinstein seen by 11 million viewers. The special titled "Michael Feinstein: The Sinatra Project" was nominated for Outstanding Music Direction at the 64th Primetime Creative Arts Emmy Awards.

In 2012, Tania Castroverde Moskalenko was hired to lead the organization. She was previously the CEO at the Germantown Performing Arts Center in Germantown, TN.  Under her leadership, the Center continued to expand the breadth and diversity of programming offered in its three venues and attained increased funding from individual and corporate sources.  In March 2015, the Center announced a significant four-year sponsorship agreement with Carmel-based Allied Solutions.  

In August 2016 Moskalenko resigned from her position and Board Chair, Jeffrey C. McDermott (Partner, of the law firm Krieg DeVault) assumed the role of Interim President and CEO. In August 2017 McDermott was officially elected by the Center Board as the new full time President/CEO.  McDermott will also remain Senior Counsel to Krieg DeVault.

References

External links
Official Website

Theatres in Indiana
Buildings and structures in Hamilton County, Indiana
Tourist attractions in Hamilton County, Indiana
Music venues completed in 2011
Music venues in Indiana
Carmel, Indiana
David M. Schwarz buildings
Performing arts centers in Indiana
New Classical architecture